Pudahuelia is a moth genus in the subfamily Autostichinae. It contains the species Pudahuelia modesta, which is found in central Chile.

The wingspan is 14–17 mm for males and 15–17 mm for females.

References

Autostichinae
Moths described in 2013
Endemic fauna of Chile